This is a list of mayors of Green Bay, Wisconsin.  Originally, the mayoral term in Green Bay was one year. In 1904, the mayoral term was changed to two years. In 1967, the mayoral term was changed to four years.

The current mayor is Eric Genrich, who was officially sworn into office on April 15, 2019.  The previous mayor, Jim Schmitt, was the longest-serving mayor in Green Bay's history, at 16 years (2003–2019).

List of mayors

References

External links
Mayor's Office
Biographies of Green Bay mayors

green Bay